The Supreme Court of Alabama is the highest court in the state of Alabama. The court consists of a chief justice and eight associate justices. Each justice is elected in partisan elections for staggered six-year terms. The Supreme Court is housed in the Heflin-Torbert Judicial Building in downtown Montgomery, Alabama.

The Governor of Alabama may fill vacancies when they occur for the remainder of unexpired terms. The current partisan line-up for the court is all Republican. There is no specific limitation on the number of terms to which a member may be elected. However, the state constitution under Amendment 328, adopted in 1973, prohibits any member from seeking election once they have attained the age of seventy years. This amendment would have prohibited then Chief Justice Roy Moore from seeking re-election in 2018. However, on April 26, 2017, Moore announced his intent to run for the United States Senate seat formerly held by United States Attorney General Jeff Sessions, and resigned from the court.

The Clerk of Court is Julia Jordan Weller.

History
The Supreme Court of Alabama was organized under the governorship of William Wyatt Bibb, and had its beginnings with the Alabama Constitution of 1819, which stated that until the General Assembly deemed otherwise, the functions of the Supreme Court would be handled by the judges of the Alabama circuit courts. The circuit judges were elected by a joint vote of both houses of the Alabama Legislature. These judges met in May 1820 in the capital city of Cahaba for the first term of the Supreme Court. Clement Comer Clay was appointed by the other judges as the first chief justice of the court. Following his resignation in 1823, he was succeeded by Abner Smith Lipscomb.

The court was then reorganized in 1832. It then became a separate court with three justices elected to six-year terms. Abner Lipscomb remained as chief justice. In 1851 the number of justices was increased to five. In 1853 the membership of the court was reduced to three again. By this time the court had its own chambers in the newly completed Alabama State Capitol. No changes to the court occurred during the years of the Civil War.

The new state constitution of 1868, drafted during the Reconstruction Era, committed the election of the three justices to the people rather than the legislature. The number of justices was increased to four in 1889. In 1891, the number increased to five. Following the adoption of the 1901 constitution, the 1903 session of the legislature raised the number of justices to seven. In 1940 the Supreme Court moved from the Capitol Building to 445 Dexter Avenue. The building had been built as a Scottish Rite temple in 1926 but was sold to the state during the financially difficult years of the Great Depression. The state acquired and started a remodel of the building in 1938 for the relocation of the Judicial Department, Attorney General and State Law Library.

Legislative Act Number 602, 1969 Alabama Acts was passed during Regular Session of 1969. It increased the number of associate justices to eight, bringing the number of court justices to the configuration that remains today. Former Justice Janie L. Shores was the first of six women to serve on the court. She was elected to the court in 1974. The first of three black justices to serve on the court was former Justice Oscar W. Adams Jr., who in 1980 was initially appointed by then Governor Fob James to serve the remainder of an unexpired term. Justice Adams would become the first black justice elected to the court when he was elected two years later to serve a full six-year term. The court moved to the new Heflin-Torbert Judicial Building at 300 Dexter Avenue in 1994. In 2022 the Supreme Court of Alabama Chief Justice Tom Parker Issued a letter of apology on behalf of the State of Alabama to the Echota Cherokee Tribe of Alabama.

Jurisdiction
The Supreme Court of Alabama has the authority to review decisions by all the lower courts of the state and the authority to determine certain legal matters over which no other court has jurisdiction. It further has the authority to issue any necessary orders to carry out the general superintendence of the Unified Judicial System of Alabama. It has exclusive jurisdiction over all appeals in disputes exceeding $50,000, as well as appeals from the Alabama Public Service Commission.

The chief justice also serves as the administrative head of the Alabama Judicial System. The court makes all rules governing administration, practice, and procedure for all Alabama courts. The exercise of this authority eliminates technicalities which usually cause delays in trial courts and reversals in appellate courts.

Chief Justices

The Alabama Supreme Court has had an unusually high turnover in the chief justice position, going back to October 1995. Since then, the post has been occupied by eight different individuals for nine different time periods. Not one of these individuals has completed an entire term of six years. 

Perry Hooper Sr., elected in 1994, did not assume the office until October, 1995, after a protracted election contest that prevented him from taking office until nine months into the term. He was succeeded by Roy Moore, who was elected in 2000 but removed from office due to violations of the judicial canon of ethics. Associate Justice Gorman Houston acted as temporary chief justice during Moore's suspension but before his actual removal from office. After Moore vacated the office, the Governor appointed Drayton Nabers Jr. Sue Bell Cobb defeated Chief Justice Nabers in 2006. Cobb resigned for personal reasons in the middle of her term. Her replacement, Chuck Malone was appointed on August 1, 2011, by Governor Robert Bentley but was defeated for re-nomination by former Chief Justice Roy Moore in 2012.

Moore assumed the office a second time beginning in January 2013, and was again suspended from office on May 6, 2016, by the Court of the Judiciary. Associate Justice Lyn Stuart became chief justice on April 26, 2017, when Moore formally resigned from the seat from which he was already suspended. Moore then sought election to the U.S. Senate seat vacated by Jeff Sessions for which a special election was held in December 2017. Stuart was appointed for the remainder of the term by Governor Kay Ivey on April 26, 2017. Chief Justice Stuart, who became the first female Republican chief justice, has been an associate justice of the court since 2001. She faced Associate Justice Tom Parker in the GOP primary in June 2018, and lost the primary to Parker in a relatively close race. Parker had previously lost a GOP primary for the post to Drayton Nabers in 2006.  

In November 2018, Alabamians selected a new chief justice when Republican Tom Parker easily defeated Democrat Robert Vance. Justice Parker became the eighth different chief justice in only seventeen years when he assumed office on January 11, 2019. When Parker became chief justice, he vacated the associate justice seat he then held and Governor Kay Ivey appointed outgoing Justice Mendheim to the seat. Chief Justice Parker is 67 years old and will not be constitutionally eligible to seek another term in 2024, thus resulting in another new chief justice in 2025.

List of all chief justices of Alabama Supreme Court:

 Clement Claiborne Clay
 Abner Smith Lipscomb
 Reuben Saffold
 Henry Hitchcock (D)
 Arthur F. Hopkins (D)
 Henry W. Collier (D)
 Edmund S. Dargan (D)
 William P. Chilton (D)
 George Goldthwaite (D)
 Samuel F. Rice (D)
 Abram J. Walker (D)
 Elisha W. Peck (R)
 Thomas Minott Peters (R)
 Robert C. Brickell (D)
 George W. Stone (D)
 Robert C. Brickell (D) (re-elected)
 Samuel D. Weakley Jr. (D)
 John R. Tyson (D)
 James R. Dowdell (D)
 John C. Anderson (D)
 Lucien D. Gardner (D)
 J. Ed Livingston (D)
 Howell Heflin (D)
 C.C. Torbert (D) (1977-1989)
 Ernest C. Hornsby (D) (1989-1995)
 Perry O. Hooper Sr. (R) (1995–2001)
 Roy Moore (R) (2001–2003)
 Gorman Houston (R) (acting 2003–2004) 
 Drayton Nabers Jr. (R) (2004–2007)
 Sue Bell Cobb (D) (2007–2011)
 Chuck Malone (R) (2011–2013)
 Roy Moore (R) (2013–2017)
 Lyn Stuart (R) (acting 2016–2017; appointed 2017–2019)
 Tom Parker (R) (2019–present)

Current Justices

Most of the  members of the court initially came to their seats via election, with two exceptions:

 Justice Lyn Stuart's elevation to the chief justice position created a vacancy in the associate justice seat she held. That vacancy was filled by Governor Kay Ivey on May 25, 2017, with the appointment of Justice William B. Sellers.  
 Justice Tom Parker became chief justice on January 14, 2019, vacating the associate justice seat he held. On December 28, 2018, Governor Ivey appointed outgoing Justice Brady E. Mendheim Jr. to that seat, effective January 15, 2019. Mendheim had previously been appointed by Ivey to replace Justice Glenn Murdock, who resigned effective January 2018; Mendheim was defeated in the election to serve the remainder of that term.

Administrative Office of the Courts and State Marshals
The Administrative Office of the Courts is under the leadership of a director appointed by the chief justice of the Court. The Administrative Office of the Courts is responsible for a variety of functions including but not limited to the Juvenile Probation Offices for the Family Court System, Child Support Enforcement, Human Resources Division of the Court, and the Court Interpreter Registry. The current director, Rich Hobson, was appointed by Chief Justice Tom Parker to the position in January, 2019. This is Hobson's third time in the position having previously served in the post from 2001 to 2003 and from 2013 to 2016.

The State of Alabama marshals are responsible for protection of the Supreme Court, Court of Criminal Appeals, and the Court of Civil Appeals. They also serve subpoenas and court documents among other duties. The current marshal of the Alabama Appellate Courts is Earl Marsh, who was appointed in 2020.

See also

 Courts of Alabama
 Alabama Court of Civil Appeals
 Alabama Court of Criminal Appeals

References

External links
 

Alabama
Alabama state courts
Politics of Alabama
1819 establishments in Alabama
Courts and tribunals established in 1819